Åsane is a borough of the city of Bergen in Vestland county, Norway.  The borough makes up the northern part of the city, north of the city centre.

Åsane is connected to downtown Bergen by the E16/E39 highway.  The E16 highway continues on through Åsane to the southeast to the neighboring borough of Arna. The E39 highway continues north through Åsane to the Nordhordland Bridge and then on to the northern municipalities in Vestland county. There are plans to shorten the E39 highway through Åsane, including the construction of two tunnels: Eikås Tunnel (start of construction 2010) and the Nyborg Tunnel (still in the planning stages). Most buses passing through Åsane stop at the centrally located Åsane Terminal.

History

The area that is now the borough of Åsane was historically called Aasene and it was a parish in the large municipality of Hamre from 1838 until 1 January 1904, when it was separated from Hamre to become a separate municipality.  The new municipality of Åsane existed from then until 1 January 1972 when it was merged with the city of Bergen (along with the other neighboring municipalities of Arna, Fana, and Laksevåg). The Åsane area a primarily agricultural area until the 1960s-1970s when it was built up into a suburb of the city of Bergen. Centrally located in Åsane are the Gullgruven and Åsane Storsenter shopping centres, including a large IKEA store. Bergen Trotting track and Eikås Motorsport Centre are located at Haukås. The Bergen Jail is located at Hylkje in Åsane.

Geography
Åsane lies on a peninsula surrounded by the Byfjorden, Salhusfjorden, and Sørfjorden.

Villages and neighborhoods
The borough is somewhat rural in nature with several large developed villages and neighborhoods separated by forested mountains.  Some of the larger village areas include Eidsvåg, Tertnes, Flaktveit, Hordvik and Hylkje.

Culture and sport
Åsane has produced two well-known bands, Salhuskvintetten and Vinskvetten, formerly known as "Salhusvinskvetten". Kurt Nilsen's former band Breed is also from Åsane.

Åsane Fotball (soccer) is Norway's largest sports club. Its senior team plays in the second division.

Tertnes (part of Åsane) handball team, are one of the best handball teams in Norway, and are currently playing in the elite division.

Notable residents

Andreas Bakkerud (1991), racing driver
Roald Bruun-Hansen (1962), footballer, Sports Manager SK Brann, former manager The Football Association of Norway (NFF)
Mette Davidsen (1976), handball player
Trude Gundersen (1977), Olympic silver medal winner in taekwondo
Helge Haugen (1982), footballer
Heikki Holmås (1972), politician
Stig Holmås (1946), author
Helge Jordal (1946), actor 
Kurt Nilsen (1978), musician and winner of Idol (Norway) and World Idol
Nathalie Nordnes (1984), musician
Arne Sandstø (1966), football coach
Kenneth Storvik (1972), footballer
Anders Styve (1974), boxer
Alex Marcel Valencia (1979), footballer
Lars Vaular (1984), rapper

References

External links
 Åsane Football Club
 Åsane Shoppingcenter
 Åsane videregående skole
 http://www.tertneshandball.no/

Boroughs of Bergen